Gregory Burke (born 1968) is a Scottish playwright and screenwriter from Rosyth, Fife.

Early life and education
Burke's family moved to Gibraltar in 1979 and returned to Dunfermline in 1984. He attended St John's Primary in Rosyth, St Christopher's Middle School and Bayside Comprehensive in Gibraltar, and St Columba's High School, Dunfermline. He attended the University of Stirling for two years before dropping out.

Works
Burke's first play was Gagarin Way, set in the factories of West Fife. His play Black Watch, for the National Theatre of Scotland, debuted at the 2006 Edinburgh Festival Fringe, meeting with critical acclaim. Black Watch has since been performed throughout Scotland and has also toured theatres internationally. Burke has also written Occy Eyes, The Straits, Unsecured, On Tour, Liar, and Shell Shocked. His most recent play was Hoors, which opened at the Traverse Theatre on 1 May 2009.

Controversy
Burke's time at Stirling University was cut short by an attack he and three others made on a fellow student. In May 2009, Burke turned down an honorary degree from Stirling, stating he wanted to avoid any embarrassment to the institution. According to the victim's family, he has not contacted them to apologize for this attack.

List of works

Plays
 Black Watch
 The Chain Play (with others)
 Unsecured
 Gagarin Way
 Hoors
 Liar
 On Tour
 The Party
 The Straits

Film
 '71 (2014)
 Entebbe (2018)

Television
 One Night in Emergency (2010)

References

Scottish dramatists and playwrights
Scottish people of Irish descent
People from Rosyth
1968 births
Living people
People educated at St Columba's Roman Catholic High School, Dunfermline